Blaenau Ffestiniog Amateur Football Club are a Welsh football club from Blaenau Ffestiniog, Gwynedd. They play in the North Wales Coast East Football League Premier Division, which is in the fourth tier of the Welsh football league system.. Founded in 1883, they are given the nickname "The Quarrymen" due to the quarry history around the town.

The Quarry Men play their home games at Cae Clyd.

History 
Football has been played in the slate stronghold of Blaenau Ffestiniog since the 1880s when clubs like Festiniog Town, Blue Stars, Festiniog Juniors and Festiniog Athletic played regular friendlies.

Ffestiniog became founder members of the Cambrian League in 1896 but football during this period was rarely covered in the press.

At the turn of the century Blaenau's population was over 10,000 and such was the support for football that a local league was formed.

1906 saw the first appearance of a Blaenau side in the senior leagues when Ffestiniog Town entered the North Wales Coast League, winning it in 1912–13.

Reforming after the First World War as "Blaenau Ffestiniog Comrades of the Great War FC" the club grew and under the name Blaenau Ffestiniog FC.

From their venture into the Welsh National League (1921–30), through the North Wales Combination to the previous incarnation of the Welsh Alliance – the Welsh League North the club won their fair share of silverware. The highlight was the 1971–72 season when they won the Welsh League, North Wales Coast Challenge Cup, Alves Cup and Cookson Cup.

During the late 1970s CPD Blaenau Ffestiniog FC, continued their policy of hiring semi-professionals from the Liverpool or Wrexham areas to form their first team squad. Those locals with an interest in playing regularly had therefore no outlet except as a reserve team run by the club on and off. The players drifted off to sign for clubs outside the town; this was unacceptable to many. The senior club flirted on and off with a reserve side for locals but when the decision was made at the end of the 1979–80 season to drop the reserve team for financial reasons matters came to a head.

On 17 July 1980 when a meeting was held at the North Western Hotel to discuss the formation of a new football club. Chaired by former Bolton Wanderers and West Bromwich Albion star Gwilym Roberts the meeting was a great success and the present BLAENAU AMATEURS FC was formed and officials elected to administer the club.

Gwilym Roberts was elected as manager for the first season and the club successfully applied for membership of the Vale of Conwy Football League, gaining entry to Section A. Aided by numerous cash donations the club started its first playing season away at Conwy British Legion.

The first match ended in success, a 5–1 win for the Amateurs, but the club took time in establishing itself and it was not until the 1983–84 season that the club gained its first honour in the form of the League's Frank Tyldesley Trophy which they successfully retained the following season and regained in 1986–87.

They had to wait until 1987–88 for their first Vale of Conwy League title which they won by two points from Penmaenmawr in a very tight finish. Having completed the season as runners-up the previous year, it was an even greater pleasure to take the championship unbeaten and to complete the double by winning the League's Challenge Cup in a final against near neighbours Dolwyddelan.

This success, coupled with the fact that they were by now amongst the top clubs in the Vale of Conwy League, prompted an application to join the Gwynedd League. The application was successful and their membership of that League commenced at the start of the 1988–89 term.

They became established members of the Gwynedd League but silverware proved very elusive with a mid table finish the norm. Due to financial problems the club resigned from the League in 1996 and operated back in the Vale of Conwy League where they had been active with a reserve side.

In their third season in the VoC they took the title and having recovered their financial stability gained promotion back to the Gwynedd for the 1999–2000 season.

They reached their first Cup Final in that same season but lost to Pwllheli FC in the Eryri Shield final. Four seasons later saw the Amateurs win their first Gwynedd League trophy beating Beaumaris Town in the final of the President's Cup, retaining it in 2004–05 by beating Nantlle Vale. That season saw them get their name on the Gwynedd Cup for the first time by beating Nefyn United in the final.

Successful years 
The first successful season was the 1987–88 term when the club won the Vale of Conwy League title by two points from Penmaenmawr in a very tight finish. Having completed the season as runners-up the previous year, it was an even greater pleasure to take the championship unbeaten and to complete the double by winning the League's Challenge Cup – then sponsored by the North Wales Weekly News – in a final against near-neighbours Dolwyddelen.

This success, coupled with the fact that they were by now amongst the top clubs in the Vale of Conwy League, prompted an application to join the Gwynedd League. The application was successful and their membership of that League commenced at the start of the 1988–89 term.

The 2008–09 season has proved to be their best ever with the club winning the Gwynedd League championship for the first time. Their away form was outstanding going the whole season unbeaten but not without its cost. Injuries began to plague the first team squad as goalkeeper 'Spens' Hughes broke his leg, wing-back Aled Owen sustaining a long-term knee injury, creative midfielder John O'Donovan suffering a niggling hamstring problem, striker Gareth Roberts missing the season end with an ankle injury and Ceri Roberts carrying a calf strain throughout most of the second half of the season.

Manager Brian Vaughan, who took over the reins at the beginning of the season had to rely heavily on young reserve players like Karl Kavanagh and Rhys Jones to fill his squad and they deserve great credit for their commitment and dedication in support of the first team squad.

Keeper Pete Jones came out of retirement, cracked a rib and came back again to help them win the President's Cup for the third time by beating Llangefni Town Res. 2–1 at Porthmadog.

Management Team 
Secretary: Andrew "Andies" Roberts

Chairman: Dewi Prysor

Manager: Ian (Mel)Roberts & Geraint Owen

Assistant Manager: 

Club Captain: Andrew "Pickles" Roberts

Current squad 

Football clubs in Wales
Welsh Alliance League clubs
1882 establishments in Wales
Gwynedd League clubs
Blaenau Ffestiniog
Ardal Leagues clubs
Welsh National League (North) clubs
Vale of Conwy Football League clubs
Welsh League North clubs
North Wales Coast League clubs